This is a list of people elected Fellow of the Royal Society in 1930.

Fellows 

Herbert Stanley Allen
Sir Edward Battersby Bailey
Frederick Tom Brooks
Paul Adrien Maurice Dirac
Harold Ward Dudley
Charles Alfred Edwards
Harry Eltringham
Sir Charles Edward Inglis
Sir Eric Keightley Rideal
Robert Robison
Sir Harold Spencer Jones
John Stephenson
Sir George Paget Thomson
Charles Todd
William Whiteman Carlton Topley

Foreign members
Gerard Jakob De Geer
Tullio Levi-Civita

Statute 12 fellows 

James Ramsay MacDonald
Jan Christiaan Smuts

1930
1930 in science
1930 in the United Kingdom